TinyCo is a mobile video game studio and the creator of Family Guy: The Quest for Stuff, Futurama Worlds of Tomorrow, Marvel Avengers Academy, Guess!, Spellstorm, Tiny Castle, Tiny Monsters, Tiny Village, and Tiny Zoo.

History
The San Francisco studio was founded by Suli Ali and Ian Spivey in 2009. The company started as a Facebook game developer and switched to a mobile app focus in late 2010. They originally specialized in social video games such as Guess!, Spellstorm, Tiny Castle, Tiny Monsters, Tiny Village, and Tiny Zoo.

In February 2011, the company raised $18 million in series A funding led by venture capital firm Andreessen Horowitz and including Anthony Casalena and SV Angel. Marc Andreessen joined Suli Ali on the company's board of directors as a part of this investment round.

In May 2011, the company launched a $5 million investment fund, called the TinyFund, to help support development of mobile games. The TinyFund provided developers up $500,000 per title, to help create games played on the iPhone, iPad or Android. In addition, TinyCo agreed to offer marketing, development and business assistance as needed.

In November 2013, the company raised $20 million in series B funding from Andreessen Horowitz and Pinnacle Ventures. Part of this investment was resolving the company's debt. This funding round was preceded by layoffs at the company and also signified a new strategy that emphasizes deeper game play and higher budget titles such as Family Guy: The Quest for Stuff. Mike O’Brien joined the company's board as a part of this investment round.

In July 2016, TinyCo was acquired by Jam City, the mobile game publisher behind Cookie Jam, Panda Pop, and Genies and Gems.

List of mobile applications
See List of video games for mobile video games

List of video games

References

Video game development companies
Video game publishers
Video game companies of the United States
Video game companies established in 2009
Companies based in San Francisco
Mobile game companies
2016 mergers and acquisitions